Pseudomelatoma penicillata, common name the doleful turrid, is a species of small sea snail, a marine gastropod mollusk in the family Pseudomelatomidae.

The variety † Pseudomelatoma penicillata var. semiinflata Grant & Gale, 1931: synonym of Burchia semiinflata (Grant & Gale, 1931)

Description
The length of the shell varies between 30 mm and 47 mm.

Distribution
This marine species occurs off California, USA, and in the Sea of Cortez, Western Mexico.

References

 Carpenter, Journ. de Conchyl., ser. 3, vol. 12, p. 146, April, 1865.
 Kantor Yu.I. (1988) On the anatomy of Pseudomelatominae (Gastropoda, Toxoglossa, Turridae) with notes on functional morphology and phylogeny of the subfamily. Apex 3(1): 1-19
 Turgeon, D.; Quinn, J.F.; Bogan, A.E.; Coan, E.V.; Hochberg, F.G.; Lyons, W.G.; Mikkelsen, P.M.; Neves, R.J.; Roper, C.F.E.; Rosenberg, G.; Roth, B.; Scheltema, A.; Thompson, F.G.; Vecchione, M.; Williams, J.D. (1998). Common and scientific names of aquatic invertebrates from the United States and Canada: mollusks. 2nd ed. American Fisheries Society Special Publication, 26. American Fisheries Society: Bethesda, MD (USA). . IX, 526

External links

 
 Gastropods.com: Pseudomelatoma penicillata

Pseudomelatomidae
Gastropods described in 1864